Alun Owen Morgan (born 14 April 1994) is a Welsh cricketer who played for Glamorgan County Cricket Club. Primarily a slow left-arm orthodox bowler, he also bats right handed. He made his T20 debut on 18 July 2019, for Glamorgan against Somerset, in the 2019 t20 Blast. Morgan was released by Glamorgan ahead of the 2021 County Championship.

References

External links
 

1994 births
Living people
Welsh cricketers
Cricketers from Swansea
Glamorgan cricketers
Cardiff MCCU cricketers
Wales National County cricketers